KSWB (840 AM, "Radio Clatsop") is an American radio station licensed to serve Seaside, Oregon, United States.  The station, which began broadcasting in 1968, is currently owned and operated by John Chapman while the broadcast license is held by KSWB Productions, LLC.

Programming
KSWB broadcasts a classic hits music format.  In addition to its usual music programming this station also airs hourly newscasts from the Associated Press.

History

Launch on 930
This station began broadcasting on July 12, 1968, as a daytime-only station with 1,000 watts of power on a frequency of 930 kHz.  The Seaside Broadcasting Corporation, with Gerald B. "Jerry" Dennon as president, held the license for the station which was assigned the KSWB call sign by the Federal Communications Commission.  Dennon, founder of Jerden Records, co-owned Seaside Broadcasting and KSWB with American folk group The Brothers Four.

KSWB licensee Seaside Broadcasting Corporation was acquired by new owners on June 20, 1972.  The station aired a contemporary music format throughout the 1970s.

Move to 840
In March 1981, this station applied to the FCC for authorization to change broadcast frequencies from 930 kHz to 840 kHz and add nighttime service at 500 watts of power. A construction permit to make these changes was finally issued on May 29, 1984.

Seaside Broadcasting Corporation encountered financial difficulties and in March 1991 applied to the FCC to transfer the broadcast license for KSWB to Kenneth S. Eiler, acting as trustee. The transfer was approved by the FCC on June 3, 1991.  In December 1991, trustee Kenneth S. Eiler reached an agreement to sell this station to the Monte Corporation.  The deal was approved by the FCC on January 15, 1992, and the transaction was consummated on April 17, 1992.

In January 1995, the Monte Corporation reached an agreement to sell this station to Kenneth B. Ulbricht.  The deal was approved by the FCC on October 5, 1995, and the transaction was consummated on the same day.

In February 1998, Ken Ulbricht reached an agreement to sell this station to Dolphin Radio, Inc.  The deal was approved by the FCC on May 11, 1998, and the transaction was consummated on June 26, 1998.

In June 1999, Dolphin Radio, Inc., reached an agreement to sell this station to New Northwest Broadcasters through their New Northwest Broadcasters II, Inc., subsidiary.  The deal was approved by the FCC on August 24, 1999, but the transaction was not consummated and the license remained with Dolphin Radio.  In October 1999, Dolphin Radio, Inc., reached a new agreement to sell this station, this time to Cannon Beach Radio, LLC.  The deal was approved by the FCC on January 6, 2000, and the transaction was consummated on March 10, 2000.

KSWB today
In January 2005, Cannon Beach Radio, LLC, reached an agreement to sell this station to KSWB Licensee, LLC.  The deal was approved by the FCC on March 23, 2005, and the transaction was consummated on April 1, 2005.

In November 2016 KSWB began simulcasting on FM translator K251CD 98.1 FM Seaside and rebranded as "Radio Clatsop".

Translator
KSWB is also broadcast on the following FM translator:

Previous logo

References

External links
KSWB Online

SWB
Classic hits radio stations in the United States
Radio stations established in 1968
Seaside, Oregon
1968 establishments in Oregon